Amou is a village in western Benin. It is located in Savalou commune in the Collines Department.  Prior to 1999 Amou was part of the former Zou Province.

References

External links
Satellite map at Maplandia.com

Populated places in Benin